Lioudmila Kortchaguina (born 26 July 1971) is a Canadian marathon runner of Russian descent. Kortchaguina was born in Yekaterinburg, Soviet Russia, and became a Canadian citizen in June 2005. She has represented Canada internationally in events such as the 2005 IAAF World Half Marathon Championships and the 2006 Commonwealth Games.

IAAF World Ranking

Kortchaguina's current world ranking in Women's Marathon is 914th, with her overall world ranking at 9,692nd. As for her highest ever world ranking positions, she was ranked 837th in Women's Marathon, 656th in Women's Road Running, and 8,979th in Women's Overall Ranking.

IAAF Race Records

Kortchaguina's first recorded IAAF Race result occurred on August 7, 1982, in Leningrad(RUS), where she competed in the 5,000m race and placed 1st with a time of 16:27 (16 minutes & 27 seconds). The next day on August 8, 1982, Kortchaguina achieved another 1st-place finish, this time in the 10,000m race. She finished with a time of 34:04.5 (34 minutes & 4.5 seconds).

On October 13, 1996, Kortchaguina finished 1st in the Lyon Marathon in France, with a time of 2:35:35 (2 hours, 35 minutes, & 35 seconds). Less than a month later, on November 10, 1996, she finished 4th in the Puteaux Marathon in France, with a time of 2:34:39 (2 hours, 34 minutes, & 39 seconds). The winner of the 1996 Puteaux Marathon, Lidia Panciu, finished with a time of 2:33:22, only 1 minute & 17 seconds faster than Kortchaguina.

On October 15, 2000, Kortchaguina competed in the Istanbul Marathon, achieving a 7th-place finish with a time of 2:46:00 (2 hours & 46 minutes).

In the 2006 Commonwealth Games, held in Melbourne, Kortchaguina achieved a 6th-place finish in Women's Marathon with a time of 2:36:43 (2 hours, 36 minutes, & 43 seconds).

References

External links
 
 
 
 

1971 births
Living people
Athletes from Toronto
Sportspeople from Yekaterinburg
Russian female marathon runners
Russian female long-distance runners
Canadian female long-distance runners
Canadian female marathon runners
Canadian people of Russian descent
Naturalized citizens of Canada
Soviet emigrants to Canada
Commonwealth Games competitors for Canada
Athletes (track and field) at the 2006 Commonwealth Games
World Athletics Championships athletes for Canada